Fabio Pacucci is an Italian theoretical astrophysicist and science educator, currently at Harvard University and at the Smithsonian Astrophysical Observatory. He is widely known for his contributions to the study of black holes, in particular the first population of black holes formed in the Universe and high redshift quasars. He discovered the only two candidate direct collapse black holes known so far, and he was in the team that discovered the farthest lensed quasar known. Pacucci is also a science educator, engaged in public talks on astronomy and science in general. Since 2018 he is a collaborator of TED in developing educational videos about science. The four videos released so far were watched by millions of people worldwide and translated into 25 languages.

Education and career 
Fabio Pacucci was born in 1988 in Apulia, a region in the southern part of Italy. He received his B.Sc. in Physics and his M.Sc. in Astronomy and Astrophysics at the Sapienza University of Rome, and his Ph.D. in Physics in 2016 at the Scuola Normale Superiore in Pisa (Italy). He then moved to Yale University in the United States as a postdoctoral researcher, before spending some time as a NOVA Fellow at the Kapteyn Astronomical Institute (Netherlands). He is currently the Clay and BHI Fellow at the Center for Astrophysics  Harvard & Smithsonian.

Prizes and fellowships 
Fabio Pacucci received several prizes for his work on black holes, including:

 2019: Clay Fellowship at the Smithsonian Astrophysical Observatory
 2017: “IAU Ph.D.” Prize – International Astronomical Union prize for his Ph.D. Thesis
 2017: “Livio Gratton” Prize – Prize for the best Ph.D. thesis in astronomy in Italy (period 2014-2016)
 2012: “Enrico Persico” Prize – Prize from the Accademia Nazionale dei Lincei

Scientific contributions 
Fabio Pacucci is known for his contributions to theoretical astrophysics, specifically to the study of black holes and the early Universe. He also published some papers on the study of dark matter and on planetary dynamics. His main field of study is the formation, growth and observational properties of the first population of black holes formed in the Universe. In 2015 he developed the first code to accurately predict the observational properties of high redshift black hole seeds, named GEMS (Growth of Early Massive Seeds). With this tool, he led the team that discovered the first, and thus far only, direct collapse black hole candidates, using data from the Hubble Space Telescope, the Chandra X-ray Observatory and the Spitzer Space Telescope. In 2019 he participated in the discovery of the first strongly lensed quasar in the epoch of reionization, also known as “the brightest quasar in the Universe”, led by Xiaohui Fan. Pacucci described the theoretical consequences of this detection, and the possibility of an undetected population of quasars, in a study with Avi Loeb.

Science education 
Fabio Pacucci is also active in the field of science education and outreach, where his most notable long-term collaboration is with TED. He acted as educator for four educational videos on topics ranging from black holes, to Hawking radiation to the three-body problem. These videos were watched by millions of people around the world and translated into 25 languages. In an interview with the Harvard Gazette, Pacucci commented “By explaining, I understand better. Sometimes simple ideas are not so simple, and they spark new solutions for old problems.”

References

External links 

 Professional website
 Harvard University profile

Italian astrophysicists
21st-century Italian astronomers
Harvard–Smithsonian Center for Astrophysics people
1988 births
Living people